Deer Creek (also Issaquena Creek or Lower Deer Creek) is a creek in Mississippi, United States. Its source is Lake Bolivar, in Scott, Bolivar County, Mississippi.

Course

As Deer Creek flows south through the Mississippi Delta, it passes through the following counties: Bolivar, Washington, Sharkey, Issaquena, and Warren; and through the following communities: Metcalfe, Stoneville, Leland, Burdett, Arcola, Hollandale, Panther Burn, Nitta Yuma, Anguilla, Rolling Fork, Cary, Onward, and Valley Park.

The Deer Creek watershed is connected to the Big Sunflower River via the Rolling Fork Creek, a connection that occurs only at high water stages and can flow either way.

Name
Deer Creek's name is an accurate preservation of its native Choctaw name isi okhina, meaning "deer river".

Muddy Waters nickname
 Muddy Waters got his nickname "Muddy Waters" by playing in the river.

See also
List of rivers of Mississippi

References

Rivers of Mississippi
Bodies of water of Bolivar County, Mississippi
Bodies of water of Sharkey County, Mississippi
Bodies of water of Washington County, Mississippi
Bodies of water of Issaquena County, Mississippi
Bodies of water of Warren County, Mississippi
Mississippi placenames of Native American origin